The 1913–14 United States collegiate men's ice hockey season was the 20th season of collegiate ice hockey.

Regular season

Standings

References

1913–14 NCAA Standings

External links
College Hockey Historical Archives

 
College